"I Love It" is a song by Australian singer-songwriter Kylie Minogue from her 15th studio album Disco (2020). It was released by Darenote and BMG on 23 October 2020. Minogue co-wrote the song with its producers Richard Stannard and Duck Blackwell.

Release
Following the release of "Say Something" and "Magic", Minogue took to her socials to announce that "I Love It" would be released on 23 October 2020, posting a clip of the song accompanied by a graphic bearing the song's title.

A five-track EP was released, containing "I Love It", the first two singles from Disco, as well as two remixes of "Magic", and a following audio video of the song was uploaded to Minogue's YouTube account.

Composition
"I Love It" is a disco song, running for a length of three minutes and fifty seconds. Minogue co-wrote the song alongside its producers Richard Stannard and Duck Blackwell.

Track listing
Digital download
 "I Love It" - 3:50
 "Magic" – 4:10
 "Say Something" – 3:32
 "Magic" (Nick Reach Up Remix) – 3:10
 "Magic" (Purple Disco Machine Remix) – 3:35

Live performances
Minogue debuted "I Love It" live during her Infinite Disco live stream, where it opened the show.

On the third episode of the fourteenth season of RuPaul's Drag Race, the song was used as a "Lip Sync for Your Life" where it was performed by contestants June Jambalaya and Maddy Morphosis.

Charts

Release history

References

2020 songs
2020 singles
Kylie Minogue songs
Disco songs
Songs written by Kylie Minogue
Songs written by Richard Stannard (songwriter)
BMG Rights Management singles
Song recordings produced by Richard Stannard (songwriter)